Oshtut-e Bala (also Romanized as Oshtūt-e Bālā; also known as Oshtūt and Ūshtūt) is a village in Jargalan Rural District, Raz and Jargalan District, Bojnord County, North Khorasan Province, Iran. At the 2006 census, its population was 815, in 204 families.

References 

Populated places in Bojnord County